Aleksei Alekseyevich Petrushin (born 29 January 1952) is a Russian professional football coach and a former player.

Playing career
He made his professional debut as a player in the Soviet Second League in 1969 for FC Torpedo Lyubertsy.

Coaching career
On 5 February 2017, Petrushin was appointed as manager of FC Ordabasy.

Honours as a player
 Soviet Top League champion: 1976 (spring).
 Soviet Top League bronze: 1973, 1975.
 Soviet Cup winner: 1977.
 Soviet Cup finalist: 1979.

References

1952 births
People from Lyubertsy
Living people
Soviet footballers
Association football midfielders
Association football defenders
FC Dynamo Moscow players
Soviet Top League players
Pakhtakor Tashkent FK players
FC Kuban Krasnodar players
Soviet football managers
Russian football managers
FK Andijan managers
FC Tyumen managers
FC Dynamo Moscow managers
Russian Premier League managers
FC Shinnik Yaroslavl managers
FC Khimki managers
FC Kairat managers
FC Dinamo Minsk managers
FC Sokol Saratov managers
FC Metallurg Lipetsk managers
Russian expatriate football managers
Expatriate football managers in Belarus
Expatriate football managers in Kazakhstan
FC Arsenal Tula managers
FC Ordabasy managers
FC Aktobe managers
Sportspeople from Moscow Oblast